The Ramanandi (IAST ), also known as Ramavats (IAST ),  Ramananda sect is the largest sect of Vaishnavas, out of 52 gates of Vaishnavism, 36 are held by Ramanandi's. They mainly emphasize the worship of Rāma, as well as Vishnu directly and also his other incarnations.

Caste
People of this sect are known as Vaishnavite in Gujarat, Uttar Pradesh, Madhya Pradesh, and Rajasthan. At the beginning of the 20th century, this sect declared to be the descendants of Rāma's sons, Kusha and Lava.

Denomination

The Ramanandi Sampradaya is one of the largest and most egalitarian Hindu sects India, around the Gangetic Plain, and Nepal today. It mainly emphasizes the worship of Rāma, as well as Vishnu directly and other incarnations.  ascetics rely upon meditation and strict ascetic practices, but also believe that the grace of god is required for them to achieve liberation. For that reason, the  section of the  ascetics, unlike some  ascetics, do not cut the sacred thread. Their reasoning for this is that only  or  can grant liberation.

Most Ramanandis consider themselves to be the followers of Ramananda, a Vaishnava saint in medieval India. Philosophically, they follow Vishishtadvaita (IAST ) tradition of Bhaghavat Ramanuja.

Its ascetic wing constitutes the largest Vaishnava monastic order and may possibly be the largest monastic order in all of India. There are two major subgroups of Ramanandi ascetics: the Tyagi, who use ash for initiation, and the Naga, who are the militant wing.

History 

Bhaktamal, a gigantic hagiographic work on Hindu saints and devotees written by Raghavadas in 1660, was a core text for all Vaishnavas including Ramanandis. This text lists Ramanuja, expounder of Vishishtadvaita school of Vedanta, and Ramananda as saints of the Ramanuja Sampradaya but Galta peeth of Ramanandi Vaishnavas have ruled out this by prohibiting Ramanuja Vaishnavas from taking Shahi snan in Kumbh Mela. Many localized commentaries of Bhaktakamal were taught to young Vaishnavas across India. In the 19th century, proliferation of the printing press in the Gangetic plains of North India allowed various commentaries of the text to be widely distributed. Of these, Bhagavan Prasad's Shri Bhaktamal: Tika, Tilak, aur Namvali Sahit was considered to be the most authoritative. In this text, Bhagvan Prasad lists 108 prominent Vaishnavas starting with Ramanuja and ending with Ramananda. Ramananda's guru Raghavananda is described as an egalitarian guru who taught students of all castes. Ramananda himself is described as an avatar of Rama, a humble student with great yogic talents who was asked to form his own sampradaya as a punishment by his guru. The text located his birth in Prayag in c. 1300 CE.

J.N. Farquhar, a noted missionary and indologist, published his own work on the Ramanandi Sampradaya based on his interaction with various Ramanandis at the Kumbh Mela of 1918. Farquhar credits Ramananda (c. 1400–1470 CE) and his followers as the origin of the North Indian practice of using Ram to refer to the Absolute. Based on the textual evidence and similarity of sect marks between Ramanandis and Sri Vaishnavas, Farquhar concludes that Ramananda migrated to Benares from Tamil Nadu. He acknowledges that Ramananda accepted disciples from all castes and did not observe the restrictions in matters of food. However, Farquhar finds no evidence to show that Ramananda endeavoured to "overturn caste as a social institution". On the other hand, Sita Ram, author of the Vaishnava history of Ayodhya, and George Grierson, eminent linguist and Indologist, represent Ramananda as saint who tried to transcend caste divisions of medieval India through the message of love and equality. The scholars also disagree on Ramananda's connection with Ramanuja. While Farquhar finds them completely unconnected, Sita Ram and Grierson place Ramananda within the Ramanuja tradition.

Up to the nineteenth century, many of the trade routes in northern India were guarded by groups of warrior-ascetics, including the Nāgā sections of the Rāmānandīs, who were feared because of their strength and fearlessness. The British took steps to disarm these militant groups of ascetics, but even today the sects still retain their heroic traditions.

Geography
Ramanandi live chiefly in the northern part of India. Ramanandi monasteries are found throughout western and central India, the Ganges basin, the Nepalese Terai, and the Himalayan foothills. Ramanandis are spread across India, mainly in Gujarat, Uttar Pradesh, Madhya pradesh and Rajasthan. The majority of Hindu immigrants to Trinidad and Tobago as well as substantial section of Hindus in United Kingdom of Great Britain belong to Vaishnava sects such as the Ramanandi. Hindus in Trinidad and Tobago currently practice based on the teachings of Ramananda.

Saints
Saints Dhanna and Pipa were among the immediate disciples of Ramananda. Hymns written by them find mention in the Adi Granth, holy scripture of the Sikhs. Sects founded by saints Raidas, Sena and Maluk Das are also of a direct Ramanandi origin.

The poet-saint Tulsidas, who composed the Ramcharitmanas, was a member of this sect. His writings made Vishnu and Shiva devotees of each other and thereby bridged the gap between Vaishnavas and Shaivites. Because Tulsidas attempted to reconcile various theologies scholars like Ramchandra Shukla do not agree that he can considered to be a Ramanandi exclusively.

Some sources say Jayadeva, who composed the Gita Govinda, was also a member of this sect. Other sources classify Jayadeva simply as a Bengal Vaishnava.

Kabir was also disciple of Ramananda and part of Ramanandi Sampradaya, Kabir also founded a separate sect that is now known as the Kabirpanthi.

Another bhakti saint, Ravidas, who was also a disciple of Ramananda, followed Ramanandi Sampradaya and also founded the Ravidassia sect.

Bhaktamal, a poem written c. 1585 in Braj language, gives short biographies of more than 200 bhaktas. It was written by Nabha Dass, a saint belonging to the tradition of Ramananda.

Image gallery

See also
 Rambhadracharya
 Balmiki sect
 Bhakti movement
 Hindu denominations

Notes

References

Sources

External links
 Ramavats (Ramanandis), Division of Religion and Philosophy, University of Cumbria
 sampradaya

Vaishnava sects
Hindu religious orders
Bhakti-era Hindu sects